The 2011 Beijing International Challenger was a professional tennis tournament played on hard courts. It was the second edition of the tournament which was part of the 2011 ATP Challenger Tour and the 2011 ITF Women's Circuit. It took place in Beijing, China between 1 and 7 August 2011.

ATP entrants

Seeds

 1 Rankings are as of July 25, 2011.

Other entrants
The following players received wildcards into the singles main draw:
  Chang Yu
  Jun Woong-sun
  Li Zhe
  Ma Yanan

The following players received entry from the qualifying draw:
  Kamil Čapkovič
  Lim Yong-kyu
  Junn Mitsuhashi
  Nikolaus Moser

WTA entrants

Seeds

 1 Rankings are as of July 25, 2011.

Other entrants
The following players received wildcards into the singles main draw:
  Duan Yingying
  Liu Chang
  Liu Wanting
  Xu Yifan

The following players received entry from the qualifying draw:
  Hu Yueyue
  Aiko Nakamura
  Zhao Di
  Zhao Yijing

Champions

Men's singles

 Farrukh Dustov def.  Yang Tsung-hua, 6–1, 7–6(7–4)

Women's singles

 Hsieh Su-wei def.  Kurumi Nara, 6–2, 6–2

Men's doubles

 Sanchai Ratiwatana /  Sonchat Ratiwatana def.  Harri Heliövaara /  Michael Ryderstedt, 6–7(7–4), 6–3, [10–3]

Women's doubles

 Chan Hao-ching /  Chan Yung-jan def.  Tetiana Luzhanska /  Zheng Saisai, 6–2, 6–3

External links
Official website
ITF Search 
ATP official site

Beijing International Challenger
Beijing International Challenger
Beijing International Challenger